The 1980 East Carolina Pirates football team was an American football team that represented East Carolina University as an independent during the 1980 NCAA Division I-A football season. In their first season under head coach Ed Emory, the team compiled a 4–7 record.

Schedule

References

East Carolina
East Carolina Pirates football seasons
East Carolina Pirates football